William Angel Rariden (February 4, 1888 – August 28, 1942), was an American professional baseball player. He played in Major League Baseball as a catcher from 1909 to 1920 for the Boston Doves/Rustlers/Braves, Indianapolis Hoosiers/Newark Pepper, New York Giants, and Cincinnati Reds.

Major League career

Before Rariden's career, most catchers were large, slow-footed players. Rariden's small size and agility helped him become one of the best catchers in major league baseball. In the Deadball Era during which Rariden played, catchers played a huge defensive role, given the large number of bunts and stolen base attempts, therefore catchers of his era usually accumulated higher assist totals than did those of subsequent eras.

Rariden had his best year offensively with the New York Giants in 1917 when he posted a .271 batting average in 101 games as, the Giants won the National League pennant before being defeated by the Chicago White Sox in the 1917 World Series. Rariden was also a member of the 1919 Cincinnati Reds team which won the scandal-plagued 1919 World Series against the Chicago White Sox.

Career statistics
In a twelve-year major league career, Rariden played in 982 games, accumulating 682 hits in 2,877 at bats for a .237 career batting average along with 7 home runs and 275 runs batted in. He ended his career with a .972 fielding percentage. Rariden led Federal League catchers twice in putouts, twice in assists and twice in baserunners caught stealing. He led National League catchers once in putouts.

References

External links

 

1888 births
1942 deaths
Major League Baseball catchers
Baseball players from Indiana
Indianapolis Hoosiers players
Newark Peppers players
Boston Doves players
Boston Rustlers players
Boston Braves players
Cincinnati Reds players
New York Giants (NL) players
People from Bedford, Indiana
Canton Chinamen players
Canton Watchmakers players
Atlanta Crackers managers
Atlanta Crackers players
Minor league baseball managers